The Lewiston Morning Tribune is an independently owned newspaper in the northwestern United States, located in Lewiston, Idaho. Founded in 1892, it serves counties in north-central Idaho and southeastern Washington, the southern portion of the Inland Empire.

Nathan Alford became the editor and publisher on October 1, 2008. after the retirement of his father A L Butch Alford, making him the fourth publisher of the Tribune. As of 2017, the Lewiston Tribune has a circulation of 25,000  papers in north-central Idaho and southeastern Washington.

It was the first newspaper in Idaho to publish an electronic edition, which was offered in September 1995. it is available via Amazon Kindle. The LCCN is sn 82014515.

Founding and ownership 
Eugene L. Alford and Albert H. Alford founded the Lewiston Morning Tribune  in 1892. It started as a four-page weekly newspaper in 1892 and it went to twice-weekly in 1895. Later it became a morning daily newspaper in 1898. Eugene worked as the publisher and business manager while Albert assumed the position of editor.

After Albert H. Alford died in 1928, his nephew Albert L. Alford (1907–1968)
returned to Lewiston from Washington and Lee University in Virginia to assume the position as a managing editor, then became the publisher and editor after his father's death in 1946. Known to his friends as "Bud" Alford,  Albert continued to work for the Tribune for 43 years. Following his death in 1968, his son, Albert Larson "Butch" Alford, became the third publisher of the Tribune.

Following 89 years of local ownership, two-thirds of the stock was sold in 1981 to TCI Newspapers of Denver. Butch Alford repurchased the Tribune from TCI in December 1997.

Community participation and recognition 
The Lewiston Morning Tribute partners with Inland 360 to publish articles about local businesses and events that are voted as the best by members of the community.
The Lewiston Morning Tribune also has a recognition article that allows people in the valley to vote once a week on a local athlete to become their "prep athlete of the week". The athlete who wins receives an article recognizing them in the sports section of the paper.

References

External links

Lewiston Morning Tribune - Google News archive 1900–2004
Lewiston Tribune - Google News archive 2004–2008

Newspapers published in Idaho
1892 establishments in Idaho
Newspapers established in 1892